Jens Laursøn Emborg (22 December 1876, Ringe – 18 April 1957, Vordingborg) was a Danish organist and composer.

See also
List of Danish composers

References

1876 births
1957 deaths
Danish composers
Male composers
People from Faaborg-Midtfyn Municipality